Juan Morales (born 19 May 1949) is a former Colombian cyclist. He competed in the individual road race at the 1972 Summer Olympics.

References

External links
 

1949 births
Living people
Colombian male cyclists
Olympic cyclists of Colombia
Cyclists at the 1972 Summer Olympics
Sportspeople from Boyacá Department
20th-century Colombian people